Channel 57 refers to several television stations:

Canada
The following television stations operate on virtual channel 57 in Canada:
 CIMT-DT-7 in Les Escoumins, Quebec
 CITY-DT in Toronto, Ontario

United States
The following television stations, which are no longer licensed, formerly broadcast on analog channel 57 in the United States:

 K57HX in Mesa, Arizona
W57AN in Ocala, Florida

See also
 Channel 57 virtual TV stations in the United States

57